Nathaniel (Nat) Foster Jr. (June 30, 1766–Mar 14, 1840) was a pioneer hunter and trapper in the Adirondack Mountains of Upstate New York.  Foster is widely credited with being the model for James Fenimore Cooper's character of "Natty Bumppo."

Personal life
Foster was born in 1766 in Hinsdale, New Hampshire, then a sparsely-settled wilderness.  When he was about ten years old his father joined the Continental Army to fight in the American Revolution.  The family, including Mrs. Foster, Nathaniel, and his five siblings, ranging in age from eleven to an infant, stayed at home to fend for themselves. In 1782 the elder Foster returned home, and determined to move his family west, into New York.  They settled in the vicinity of Fish House, New York, north of Johnstown.

When Foster was around twenty-three or twenty-four he married Jemima Streeter and the couple settled in Salisbury in Herkimer County, New York.  He farmed in the summer and hunted game in the winter, wolves, bear, and panther, and trapped for furs. He carried an unusual type of rifle called a "double shooter", which had one barrel and two locks mounted vertically so the rifle was able to fire two separate shots.

In 1832 Foster moved into the former home of Charles F. Herreshoff in Old Forge, New York, and rented his farm in Salisbury to his son, Amos. By this time he had become something of a celebrity, and there are many accounts by visitors to his home.

Feud
In Old Forge Foster engaged in a feud with a Mohawk Indian, Peter Waters, called "Drid". A series of incidents finally resulted in a knife fight, in which Foster was wounded. Following this, Drid accompanied a hunting party up the lake while Foster remained behind.  He lay in wait for their return at a place now called "Indian Point", and shot Drid as the latter approached in his canoe. Foster was tried for the murder and acquitted.

Death
Following the trial Foster and his wife spent time with relatives in Wilkes-Barre, Pennsylvania. While there he was stricken, and determined to return home to his daughter, Jemima, in Ava, New York, in present-day Oneida County. He died and was buried there in 1840.

Foster and Natty Bumppo

References

External links

 
 Re:
<li> Nicholas Stoner 
<li> Nathaniel Foster
<li>   1850.          . .
<li>  1851; 2nd ed. . . 
<li>  1857; 3rd ed.
<li> 1960; 3rd ed.
<li>  1871; 3rd ed. .

1766 births
1840 deaths
People from Hinsdale, New Hampshire
American pioneers
American hunters
People from Northampton, Fulton County, New York
People from Salisbury, Herkimer County, New York